Fortuna Hjørring is a women's association football team from Hjørring, Denmark. The club was formed in 1966 and play in green and white. Their biggest achievement in European football was reaching the 2002–03 UEFA Women's Cup final where they ultimately lost 1–7 on aggregate to Umeå IK. They are one of the two most successful clubs in Danish women's football, with among 11 titles.

The next try at a European Cup came in 2009–10 with the newly created UEFA Women's Champions League. In the round of 32 they defeated Italians Bardolino but then lost the round of 16 to eventual finalist Lyon. In the 2016–17 season they reached their best result since the final in 2003, when they made it to the quarter-finals which they lost 0–2 on aggregate to Manchester City.

Honours
 UEFA Women's Cup
 Runner-up: 2003
 Danish League (11)
 Champion: 1994, 1995, 1996, 1999, 2002, 2009, 2010, 2014, 2016, 2018, 2020
 Danish Cup (9)
 Champion: 1995, 1996, 2000, 2001, 2002, 2006, 2008, 2016, 2019
 Danish Indoor Cup (4)
 Champion: 1994, 1997, 1999, 2001

Competition record

Record in UEFA competitions
All results (away, home and aggregate) list Fortuna Hjørring's goal tally first.

a First leg.

Players

Current squad

Coaching staff

First team

Notable former players
For more former players, see :Category:Fortuna Hjørring players.

  Johanna Rasmussen (2002–2008)
  Mariann Gajhede Knudsen (2002–2010)
  Heidi Johansen (2003–2013)
  Janni Arnth (2007–2014)
  Line Sigvardsen Jensen (2009–2016, 2018–2019)
  Cathrine Paaske (2010)
  Julie Rydahl (2010)
  Camilla Kur Larsen (2012–2014, 2016–2017)
  Nadia Nadim (2012–2015, 2016)
  Sofie Junge Pedersen (2012–2015)
  Karoline Smidt Nielsen (2012–2018)
  Signe Bruun (2014–2018)
  Maria Lindblad Christensen (2012–2019)
  Luna Gewitz (2013–2019)
  Frederikke Thøgersen (2013–2019)
  Sarah Dyrehauge Hansen (2015–2019)
  Laura Frank (2015–2019)
  Caroline Møller (2015–2020)
  Agnete Nielsen (2017–2020)
  Caroline Rask (2011–2020)
  Florentina Olar (2013-2019)
  Cristina Carp (2020-21)
  Emily van Egmond (2011)
  Elise Kellond-Knight (2011–2012)
  Alison Forman (1992-1999)
  Tamires (2015–2019)
  Nora Heroum (2015–2017)
  Tuija Hyyrynen (2016–2017)
  Sanni Franssi (2018–2020)
  Emma Byrne (1999)
  Hólmfríður Magnúsdóttir (2006-2007)
  Lisa-Marie Woods (2011–2012)
  Laila Himle (2019–2020)
  Nevena Damjanović (2015–2018)
  Chi-Chi Igbo (2002-2016)
  Dominika Čonč (2016–2017)
  Augustine Ejangue (2015–2017)
  Casey Ramirez (2012)
  Tiffany Weimer (2012–2013)
  Janelle Cordia (2013–2019)
  Michelle Betos (2014)
  Sydney Payne (2015)
  Aubrey Bledsoe (2015)
  Hannah Seabert (2018–2019)
  Vicky Bruce (2020-21)
  Emily Garnier (2020-21)
  Brenna Ochoa (2020-21)
  Kelsey Daugherty (2019-2020)
  Bri Folds (2021)

References

External links
Official homepage
Danish Football Association profile
Club at uefa.com

Women's football clubs in Denmark
Association football clubs established in 1966
Hjørring
1966 establishments in Denmark